The women's hammer throw event at the 2003 European Athletics U23 Championships was held in Bydgoszcz, Poland, at Zawisza Stadion on 17 and 20 July.

Medalists

Results

Final
20 July

Qualifications
17 July
Qualifying 64.50 or 12 best to the Final

Group A

Group B

Participation
According to an unofficial count, 27 athletes from 17 countries participated in the event.

 (1)
 (1)
 (2)
 (3)
 (2)
 (2)
 (1)
 (1)
 (2)
 (1)
 (1)
 (1)
 (2)
 (1)
 (2)
 (1)
 (3)

References

Hammer throw
Hammer throw at the European Athletics U23 Championships